Michael McGlynn (born 1 February 2000) is a South African marathon swimmer. He competed in the 2020 Summer Olympics.

References

2000 births
Living people
South African male swimmers
Olympic swimmers of South Africa
Swimmers at the 2020 Summer Olympics